Carlos Javier Sobera Pardo (born 11 August 1960 in Barakaldo, Spain) is a Spanish actor, television presenter and former law lecturer.

Biography
Sobera has a law degree from the University of Deusto. He also was a professor of Civil Law at the University of the Basque Country, from 1987 to 1997. His first contact with the world of theater was in 1980 when he created, in his native Bilbao, a group called La Espuela. The group was active until 1986 and at that time staged La dama de alba by Alejandro Casona, Viva el Duque nuestro dueño by Alonso de Santos Balada de los tres inocentes by Pedro Mario Herrero.

In 1994 he began working for the Basque regional TV (Euskal Telebista) being the screenwriter of Boulevard, talk show presented by Anne Igartiburu. In 1995 he was one of the creators of the game show Los jueves, mudanza, issued by TVG. He debuted as a presenter in Euskal Telebista being presenter of the monthly program Ciudadanos and then of the daily show Arde la tarde.

In 1996 his film debut arrived when he starred, along with Imanol Arias, on Koldo Azkarreta's film Rigor Mortis. In 1997 he made a leap to national television, presenting weekly show PC Adictos on La 2. However, he rose to fame due to his roles in TV series Al salir de clase and  Quítate tú para ponerme yo, both on Telecinco.

Since then, he became one of the most popular TV presenters in Spain, hosting such shows as the Spanish versions of Who Wants to Be a Millionaire? and  The Million Pound Drop on Antena 3, and from 2016 First Dates (the Spanish adaptation of the British dating show of the same name) on Cuatro.

Works

Theatre
 La dama de Alba, actor
 Viva el Duque nuestro dueño, actor
 Balada de los tres inocentes , actor
 Tres en raya, actor and director (1991)
 Palabras encadenadas, actor (2001)
 El club de la corbata, actor (2003)
 La Guerra de los Rose, actor (2010)

Films
 Rigor Mortis (1996).
 Lo mejor de cada casa (Una semana en el parque) (2000).
 ¡¡¡Hasta aquí hemos llegado!!! (2002).
 Pacto de Brujas (2002).
 El forastero (2002).
 El lápiz del carpintero (2002).

Television

As actor
 Quítate tú pa' ponerme yo (Telecinco, 1999).
 Al salir de clase (Telecinco, 1997–1999).
 El señorío de Larrea (ETB, 1999).
 Ana y los siete, (TVE, 2002).
 Paraíso, 1 capítulo (TVE, 2002).
 London Street (Antena 3, 2003)
 Mis adorables vecinos, (Antena 3, 2004).

Other
 Boulevard, as writer (ETB, 1994)
 La familia mudanza, as writer (TVG, 1995).
 Ciudadanos, presentador y guionista (ETB, 1995).
 Arde la tarde, (ETB, 1995).
 El Día D, (ETB, 1996).
 PC Adictos, (La 2, 1997).
 La gran evasión (ETB 2).
 Doble juego, presentador (FORTA, 2002)
 Date el bote, presentador (ETB 2, 2002–2009).
 ¿Quiere ser millonario? 50 por 15, presentador (Telecinco, 1999–2001).
 ¿Hay trato?, (Antena 3, 2004).
 El Supershow, (Antena 3, 2004).
 Números Locos, (Antena 3, 2005).
 ¿Quién quiere ser millonario?, presentador (Antena 3, 2005–2008).
 El show de los récords, (Antena 3, 2006).
 El invento del siglo, (Antena 3, 2006).
 1 contra 100, (Antena 3, 2007).
 Jeopardy, (Antena 3, 2007).
 Canta! Singstar, (TVE 1, 2008)
 Los mejores años, (TVE 1, 2009)
 La lista, La 2, (2010)
 Como si fuera ayer, (7RM, (2010)
 Los Managers, Managers Cuatro (2010).
 Consumidores, (ETB 2, 2010–2011).
 Atrapa un millón, (Antena 3, 2011–2014)
 El tercero en discordia, (Antena 3, 2011)
 Avanti ¡que pase el siguiente!, (Antena 3, 2012)
 Cien x cien, (ETB 2, 2012)
 Increíbles: el gran desafío, (Antena 3, 2013)
 First Dates, (Cuatro, 2016–present)
 The Wall: Cambia tu vida, (Telecinco, 2017)
 El precio justo (Telecinco/Cuatro, 2021)

References

External links
 

1960 births
Living people
People from Barakaldo
Spanish male stage actors
Spanish male film actors
Spanish male television actors
Spanish television presenters
University of Deusto alumni
Academic staff of the University of the Basque Country